is a city located in Saitama Prefecture, Japan. , the city had an estimated population of 607,373 in 293,582 households and a population density of 9800 persons per km². It is the Greater Tokyo Area's 8th most populated city (after passing Hachioji), and second largest in Saitama Prefecture.

Geography
Kawaguchi is located near the center of the Kantō Plain in southern Saitama Prefecture, and is bordered by the Tokyo wards of Kita-ku and Adachi-ku to the south. The city area is mostly flat and mainly residential except for the Omiya tableland, which occupies part of the north and east area. The Arakawa River runs across the border with Kita-ku to the south.

Surrounding municipalities
Saitama Prefecture
 Koshigaya
 Sōka
 Saitama
 Warabi
 Toda
Tokyo Metropolis
 Kita
 Adachi

Climate
Kawaguchi has a humid subtropical climate (Köppen Cfa) characterized by warm summers and cool winters with light to no snowfall.  The average annual temperature in Kawaguchi is 14.8 °C. The average annual rainfall is 1482 mm with September as the wettest month. The temperatures are highest on average in August, at around 26.6 °C, and lowest in January, at around 3.2 °C.

Demographics 
As of May 1, 2010, registered population was 516,409, including 20,808 alien residents, continuing a trend of population growth in the city since 1933 when the city was founded. There has been a gradual increase in the number of non-Japanese residents living in the city because of the convenient location to Tokyo and relatively low rent. Now, the number of people from China is the largest, followed by Korea and Philippines.

Kawaguchi is a typical suburb city in the Tokyo metropolitan area, where population greatly changes between daytime and nighttime due to commute to big cities, especially to Tokyo. Its population growth rate declined in the mid-1990s, but recent apartment construction boom in the city has helped to increase the population growth rate again. The number of children continues to decrease in accordance with the declining number of births; in 2009 4,735 live births were recorded in the city, a marked decrease from the 1971 peak of 7,932 births. By contrast, the rate of people over the age of 65 is increasing, and stood at approximately 18.5% as of January 1, 2010, although this is still below the national average.

In 2017, 33,000 people in Kawaguchi were not Japanese citizens; 60% of them held Chinese citizenship. Around that year there had been an influx of Chinese nationals to Kawaguchi.

History 

After the last ice age, during early and middle Jōmon period, most of the area which is now Kawaguchi was under sea level except for the area which is now Omiya Tableland. Ancient peoples living in this area left several shell middens, in which shells, Jōmon pottery, and pit houses have been discovered by archaeologists. Many Kofun period  barrows were also found in Kawaguchi, however many have also been destroyed by urban development. From the Heian period onwards, Kawaguchi was part of Musashi Province. The name "Kawaguchi" appears in the Kamakura period chronicle Gikeiki, but it is not proven that this name designated current area of Kawaguchi.

During the Edo period, Kawaguchi-juku developed as a post station on the Nikkō Onari Kaidō, a highway used by the Tokugawa shōgun and daimyō to visit Nikkō Tōshō-gū. Towards the Bakumatsu period and into the Meiji period, the demand for metal products increased. Because of proximity to Tokyo and convenient water transportation using Arakawa River, Kawaguchi became the center of metal casting industry, for which it has remained famous until modern times.

The town of Kawaguchi was established within Kitaadachi District, Saitama on April 1, 1889 with the establishment of the modern municipalities system. Kawaguchi was elevated to city status on April 1, 1933 by the merger of Kawaguchi with the neighboring villages of Aoki, Minami-Hirayanagi and Yokozone. The city expanded by annexing the town of Hatogaya and villages of Shiba, Kamine and Shingō in 1940. However, Hatogaya separated from Kawaguchi in 1948 in accordance with the results of a referendum.

Kawaguchi has experienced many disasters, including flood, earthquake and war. The Arakawa River has inundated Kawaguchi countless times and ruined agriculture, which resulted in famines. Also, the 1923 Great Kantō earthquake damaged buildings in Kawaguchi, killing 99 people.

Currently, the population of Kawaguchi continues to increase, and many tall apartment buildings are being built around train stations. This is because many casting foundries moved to suburban industrial parks and the former sites were turned into residential areas.

On April 1, 2001, Kawaguchi was designated a special city, with increased local autonomy.

On October 11, 2011, Kawaguchi re-absorbed the city of Hatogaya.

Government
Kawaguchi has a mayor-council form of government with a directly elected mayor and a unicameral city council of 42 members. Kawaguchi contributes seven members to the Saitama Prefectural Assembly. In terms of national politics, the city is divided between Saitama 2nd district and  Saitama 15th district of the lower house of the Diet of Japan.

Economy

Education

Universities and colleges
 Saitama Gakuen University
 Kawaguchi Junior College
 Kawaguchi Art School of Waseda University

High schools
 operates:

The Kawaguchi Municipal Board of Education operates:

Junior high schools
(all managed by the city)

Angyo Junior High School
Angyo-higashi Junior High School
Aoki Junior High School
Haimatsu Junior High School
Higashi Junior High School
Kamiaoki Junior High School
Kamine Junior High School
Kishikawa Junior High School
Kita Junior High School
Koyaba Junior High School
Minami Junior High School
Motogo Junior High School
Nakacho Junior High School
Nishi Junior High School
Ryoke Junior High School
Sachinami Junior High School
Shiba Junior High School
Shiba-higashi Junior High School
Shiba-nishi Junior High School
Shibazono Junior High School
Shiwasuda Junior High School
Tozuka Junior High School
Tozuka-nishi Junior High School
Zaike Junior High School
Hatogaya Junior High School
Sato Junior High School
Hachimangi Junior High School

Elementary schools
(all managed by the city)

Angyo Elementary School
Angyo-higashi Elementary School
Aoki-kita Elementary School
Aoki-chuo Elementary School
Asahi-higashi Elementary School
Asahi-nishi Elementary School
Funato Elementary School
Haramachi Elementary School
Higashihongo Elementary School
Higashiryoke Elementary School
Honcho Elementary School
Iinaka Elementary School
Iizuka Elementary School
Jirin Elementary School
Kamiaoki Elementary School
Kamiaoki-minami Elementary School
Kamine Elementary School
Kamine-higashi Elementary School
Kizoro Elementary School
Nakacho Elementary School
Namiki Elementary School
Negishi Elementary School
Hatogaya Elementary School
Sato Elementary School
Sakuramachi Elementary School
Tuji Elementary School
Nakai Elementary School
Minamihatogaya Elementary School
Ryoke Elementary School
Saiwaicho Elementary School
Sashima Elementary School
Shiba Elementary School
Shiba-chuo Elementary School
Shiba-fuji Elementary School
Shiba-higashi Elementary School
Shiba-hinotume Elementary School
Shiba-minami Elementary School
Shiba-nishi Elementary School
Shingo Elementary School
Shingo-higashi Elementary School
Shingo-minami Elementary School
Shiwasuda Elementary School
Tozuka Elementary School
Tozuka-ayase Elementary School
Tozuka-higashi Elementary School
Tozuka-kita Elementary School
Tozuka-minami Elementary School
Yanagisaki Elementary School
Zaike Elementary School

Special schools
Saitama Prefectural Kawaguchi Special Needs School
Saitama Korean Kindergarten (埼玉朝鮮幼稚園) - North Korean school --  (Abolished on March 31, 2014 )

Transportation

Railway
 JR East – Keihin-Tohoku line
 -   
 JR East – Musashino line
 
  Saitama Rapid Railway Line
  -  -  -   -   -

Buses 
Kawaguchi has a highly developed bus network, mainly operated by Kokusai Kogyo Bus. The east region of the city is relatively far from train stations, many people use buses to the nearest train stations. Some bus routes have over twenty bus services an hour in the morning.

Bus operators
 Kokusai Kogyo Bus
 Tobu Bus Central

Highway
  – Kawaguchi Junction
  – Kawaguchi-Nishi Interchange, Kawaguchi-Chūō Interchange, Kawaguchi Junction, Kawaguchi-Higashi Interchange
  Kawaguchi Route – Kawaguchi Junction, Araijuku, Angyō, Shingo, Higashi Ryoke

Local attractions

 Kawaguchi Green Center
 Kawaguchi Shrine
 Former Tanaka Family Residence

Noted people from Kawaguchi
Yoshitaka Shindō, politician
Yukio Tomioka, politician
Yukio Ninagawa, stage director
Kumiko Ohba, actress
Hiroyuki Endo, retired badminton player

References

External links

Official Website 

 
Cities in Saitama Prefecture